Timo Petteri Nummelin (born November 25, 1972) is a Finnish former professional ice hockey defenceman who played in the National Hockey League for the Minnesota Wild and Columbus Blue Jackets. He was drafted by the Columbus Blue Jackets as their fifth-round pick, #133 overall, in the 2000 NHL Entry Draft.

Nummelin is the son of Timo Nummelin, a Finnish ice hockey hall of famer.

Playing career

Career in Finland
Petteri Nummelin started playing ice hockey in his hometown Turku and played for a-junior team of TPS for 3 seasons after which he played for Kiekko-67 in the 1. Division. Nummelin debuted in the SM-Liiga during the 1992–93 Season which he spent playing partly for TPS and Reipas. Nummelin also played in Kiekko-67 and TPS A-Junior team during the season. After the 1992–93 season Nummelin stayed in TPS for 2 more seasons (93–95) and moved to play in Sweden after winning the world championship for Finland.

Career in Sweden
After successful World Championship tournament in 1995 Nummelin attracted some international publicity and was contracted by Frölunda HC, a Swedish team playing in the Elitserien. Nummelin spent total of 2 seasons in Sweden.

Career in Switzerland
In 1997 Nummelin joined HC Davos, one of the most successful Swiss teams to date. Nummelin played in HC Davos for 3 seasons (1997–2000) during the time Nummelin established himself as a star in Switzerland and at the end of the 1999–2000 season Nummelin received an offer from the NHL. Nummelin Played in NHL for Columbus Blue Jackets for the 2000–2001 season and returned to Switzerland and joined HC Lugano for the 2001–2002 season. Nummelin played in Lugano for 5 seasons (2001–06) and won several honors during that time, such as the overall scoring title in 2004 and the Swiss championship in 2003 and 2006. He returned to HC Lugano for the 2008-2009 season.

Career in Japan
In 2017 Nummelin signed a contract with the Nikkō Ice Bucks, and plays in the Asian Ice Hockey League.

Announced via the Nikkō Ice Bucks, Nummelin ended his career in Japan.

NHL career
Nummelin first played for one season in the NHL during the 2000–2001 NHL season for the Columbus Blue Jackets. In 2006, after spending 5 seasons in Switzerland, Nummelin returned to the NHL and signed with the Minnesota Wild, partially due to the strong encouragement of Minnesota Wild teammate, fellow countryman and friend Mikko Koivu, whom he babysat as a child. Known as Nummy by fans and Petu on the ice, Nummelin enjoyed a resurgence in his NHL career in the early stages of the 2006–07 NHL season.

Although Nummelin displayed both strong offensive and defensive contributions during regulation play, many consider his strongest asset his ability to score in the overtime shootout. As of 7 December 2006, Nummelin converted six shootout goals in all six of his attempts, beating some of the NHL's best goalies including Nikolai Khabibulin, Roberto Luongo and Vezina winner Miikka Kiprusoff. Nummelin's success is credited to what Wild fans have dubbed "The Shoulder Shake," a deke in which Nummelin shifts his shoulders back and forth without actually moving the puck, forcing the goaltender to move first, Nummelin then reacts to the goalie's movement putting the puck in the net with the backhand or forehand. Nummelin's opportunity in the shootout initially came as a shock to fans and teammates when Minnesota Wild head coach Jacques Lemaire listed him third in the shootout lineup against the Vancouver Canucks on 10 October 2006, in the place normally given to Marian Gaborik (the first three shooters are often reserved for the team's best goal scorers). Nummelin's conversion was the deciding goal to end the shootout and win the game for the Wild. Nummelin is currently the all-time NHL shoot-out conversion leader for players with more than two attempts, with a rate of 80% (8 for 10).

After the 2007–08 NHL season, Nummelin's contract with the Wild expired, and at 35 years of age he signed a 3-year contract with his former Swiss team HC Lugano.

International career
Nummelin debuted with the Finland national team in the 1995 Ice Hockey World Championships where Finland won their first gold medal and has since represented his country in each consecutive year except 2008 and 2011. His total tournaments played count up to 15, an all-time record for most appearances in World Championships, which he held alone until 2013 when Mathias Seger tied this record.

Awards and achievements
 Pekka Rautakallio trophy for best defenceman in the SM-liiga - 1994
 World record holder in Ice Hockey World Championship tournaments played (15)
 Best defenceman of World Championship tournament 2000 and 2010
 In World Championship all-star team 2000, 2001, 2006, 2007 and 2010

Career statistics

Regular season and playoffs

International

References

External links

1972 births
Living people
Columbus Blue Jackets draft picks
Columbus Blue Jackets players
Ice hockey players at the 2006 Winter Olympics
Finnish ice hockey defencemen
Finnish ice hockey world championship gold medalists
Frölunda HC players
HC Davos players
HC Lugano players
Medalists at the 2006 Winter Olympics
Minnesota Wild players
Olympic ice hockey players of Finland
Olympic medalists in ice hockey
Olympic silver medalists for Finland
Sportspeople from Turku
Storhamar Dragons players
HC TPS players
Nikkō Ice Bucks players
Finnish expatriate ice hockey players in Sweden
Finnish expatriate ice hockey players in Norway
Finnish expatriate ice hockey players in the United States
Finnish expatriate ice hockey players in Switzerland
Finnish expatriate ice hockey players in Japan